Monorack is the name of either of two monorails running on rack railways. Both systems are used for light loads in steep environments.

 Monorackbahn systems by Doppelmayr, used mainly in Switzerland, Germany and Italy, with an edge size of 

References